Noctuides griseoviridis is a species of snout moth in the genus Noctuides. It is known from Madagascar.

References

Moths described in 1907
Epipaschiinae